Erik Grendel (born 13 October 1988) is a Slovak footballer who plays for FK Pohronie as a midfielder.

Club career
He started his senior career in Dubnica, making his league debut in July 2005 at the age of 16. After four years in Dubnica, he signed with Slovan Bratislava in September 2009.

After a spell in Poland with Górnik Zabrze, he returned to his native Slovakia, joining Spartak Trnava in July 2018.

Honours 
Slovan Bratislava
 Slovak Super Liga: 2010–11, 2012–13, 2013–14
 Slovak Cup: 2009–10, 2010–11, 2012–13

Spartak Trnava
 Slovak Cup: 2018–19

References

External links
 
 Slovan Bratislava profile
 Profile at football-lineups.com
 

1988 births
Living people
People from Handlová
Sportspeople from the Trenčín Region
Slovak footballers
Slovak expatriate footballers
Association football midfielders
MFK Zemplín Michalovce players
FK Dubnica players
ŠK Slovan Bratislava players
FC Spartak Trnava players
FK Železiarne Podbrezová players
FK Pohronie players
Górnik Zabrze players
Slovak Super Liga players
Ekstraklasa players
2. Liga (Slovakia) players
Expatriate footballers in Poland
Slovak expatriate sportspeople in Poland
Slovakia youth international footballers
Slovakia under-21 international footballers